Muscogee County is a county located on the central western border of the U.S. state of Georgia; its western border with the state of Alabama is formed by the Chattahoochee River. As of the 2020 census, the population was 206,922. Its county seat and only city is Columbus, with which it has been a consolidated city-county since the beginning of 1971.

Muscogee County is part of the Columbus, GA-AL Metropolitan Statistical Area.

The only other city in the county was Bibb City, a company town that disincorporated in December 2000, two years after its mill closed permanently. Fort Benning, a large Army installation, takes up nearly one quarter of the county and extends into Chattahoochee County; it generates considerable economic power in the region.

History

Inhabited for thousands of years by varying cultures of indigenous peoples, this area was territory of the historic Creek people at the time of European encounter.

The land for Lee, Muscogee, Troup, Coweta, and Carroll counties was ceded by a certain eight chiefs among the Creek people in the 1825 Treaty of Indian Springs.  The Creek Nation declared the land cession illegal, because it did not represent the will of the majority of the people. The United States Senate did not ratify it. The following year, the US government negotiated another treaty with the Creek, by which they ceded nearly as much territory under continued pressure from the state of Georgia and US land commissioners.

The counties' boundaries were created by the Georgia General Assembly on June 9, but they were not named until December 14 of 1826. The county was originally developed by American Indians for cotton plantations. In many areas of what became known as the Black Belt for the fertility of soil and development of plantations, American Indians who were reclassified by the government as Colored/Negro made up the majority of population in many counties.

This county was named by American Indians for the native Muscogee or Creek people. Parts of the then-large county (which extended east to the Flint River) were later taken to create every other neighboring Georgia county, including Harris County to the north in 1827.

Geography

The county is located on the fall line between the Atlantic coastal plain to the south and the Piedmont to the north. As such, the newly constructed Fall Line Freeway runs across the northern portion of the county along JR Allen Parkway, and areas across the northern part of the county are hillier compared to the southern part of the county.

The majority of Muscogee County, from north of Columbus running northeast in the direction of Ellerslie, is located in the Middle Chattahoochee River-Walter F. George Lake subbasin of the ACF River Basin (Apalachicola-Chattahoochee-Flint River Basin). The northwestern corner of the county, south of Fortson, is located in the Middle Chattahoochee River-Lake Harding subbasin of the same ACF River Basin.

Major highways

  Interstate 14 (Extension is coming)
  Interstate 185
  U.S. Route 27
  U.S. Route 27 Alternate
  U.S. Route 80
  U.S. Route 280
  State Route 1
  State Route 22
  State Route 22 Connector
  State Route 22 Spur
  State Route 85
  State Route 219
  State Route 411 (unsigned designation for I-185)
  State Route 520
  State Route 540 (Fall Line Freeway)

Adjacent counties
 Harris County (north)
 Talbot County (northeast)
 Chattahoochee County (south)
 Russell County, Alabama (southwest/CST border except for Phenix City as the city is jointed by the Columbus Metropolitan Area)
 Lee County, Alabama (west/CST border)

Demographics

2000 census
As of the census of 2000, there were 186,291 people, 69,819 households, and 47,686 families living in the county. The racial makeup of the county was 50.42% White, 43.74% Black or African American, 0.38% Native American, 1.54% Asian, 0.14% Pacific Islander, 1.90% from other races, and 1.87% from two or more races.  4.49% of the population were Hispanic or Latino of any race.

There were 69,819 households, out of which 34.60% had children under the age of 18 living with them, 44.70% were married couples living together, 19.60% had a female householder with no husband present, and 31.70% were non-families. 26.70% of all households were made up of individuals, and 9.40% had someone living alone who was 65 years of age or older.  The average household size was 2.54 and the average family size was 3.08.

In the county, the population was spread out, with 26.80% under the age of 18, 11.90% from 18 to 24, 29.80% from 25 to 44, 19.70% from 45 to 64, and 11.70% who were 65 years of age or older.  The median age was 33 years. For every 100 females, there were 94.70 males.  For every 100 females age 18 and over, there were 91.60 males.

The median income for a household in the county was $34,798, and the median income for a family was $41,244. Males had a median income of $30,238 versus $24,336 for females. The per capita income for the county was $18,262.  15.70% of the population and 12.80% of families were below the poverty line.  Out of the total population, 22.00% of those under the age of 18 and 12.10% of those 65 and older were living below the poverty line.

2010 census
As of the 2010 United States Census, there were 189,885 people, 74,081 households, and 47,742 families living in the county. The racial makeup of the county was 46.3% white, 45.5% black or African American, 2.2% Asian, 0.4% American Indian, 0.2% Pacific islander, 2.4% from other races, and 3.0% from two or more races. Those of Hispanic or Latino origin made up 6.4% of the population. In terms of ancestry, 8.7% were Irish, 8.4% were German, 6.7% were English, and 6.3% were American.

Of the 74,081 households, 35.0% had children under the age of 18 living with them, 38.3% were married couples living together, 21.3% had a female householder with no husband present, 35.6% were non-families, and 29.9% of all households were made up of individuals. The average household size was 2.47 and the average family size was 3.08. The median age was 33.5 years.

The median income for a household in the county was $41,331 and the median income for a family was $50,771. Males had a median income of $37,618 versus $31,430 for females. The per capita income for the county was $22,514. About 14.8% of families and 18.2% of the population were below the poverty line, including 26.3% of those under age 18 and 13.0% of those age 65 or over.

2020 census

As of the 2020 United States census, there were 206,922 people, 73,134 households, and 45,689 families residing in the city.

Education

Higher education

Public
 Columbus State University
 Columbus Technical College
 Troy University - main campus in Troy, Alabama

Private
 Beacon University (seminary)
 Rivertown School of Beauty
 Southeastern Beauty School
 Meadows Junior College
 University of Phoenix

Primary and secondary education

Public schools
Muscogee County School District serves all parts of the county except Fort Benning for grades K-12. Fort Benning children are zoned to Department of Defense Education Activity (DoDEA) schools for grades K-8. However, high school students attend the public high schools in the respective counties they are located in.

Private and religion-based schools
 Brookstone School (K-12)
 Calvary Christian School (Christian, K-12)
 Edgewood Christian School (Baptist, K-12)
 Grace Christian School (Christian, K-12)
 Hallie Turner Private School (9-12)
 Kip Christian Academy (Christian, K-8)
 New Bethel Christian Academy (Seventh-day Adventist, K-8)
 Our Lady of Lourdes School (Catholic, K-8)
 Our Redeemer Christian Academy (Christian, K-12)
 Pinehurst Christian School (Baptist, K-8)
 St. Anne‒Pacelli Catholic School (Catholic, K-12)
 St. Luke School (Christian, K-8)
 Victory Academy (K-8)
 Westminster Christian School (Christian, K-8)
 Wynnbrook Christian School (Baptist, K-12)

Homeschooling
In regards to homeschooling, the Official Code of Georgia Annotated states the following:

Communities

Cities
 Columbus (county seat)
 Fort Benning (military base)

Former incorporated communities
 Bibb City

Government and politics

Muscogee County has voted for Democratic candidates by increasing margins since 1992, although partisan leanings have become increasingly stratified by race, class, and in-county migration after 1965. The county has not supported a Republican for president since 1988, but broke free of Solid South voting patterns earlier than most counties in Georgia.

Presidential

United States Congress

Georgia General Assembly

Georgia State Senate

Georgia House of Representatives

See also

 National Register of Historic Places listings in Muscogee County, Georgia
List of counties in Georgia

References

External links
 Documents from Muscogee County in the Digital Library of Georgia

 
Georgia (U.S. state) counties
1826 establishments in Georgia (U.S. state)
Georgia placenames of Native American origin
Populated places established in 1826
Columbus metropolitan area, Georgia
Geography of Columbus, Georgia
Majority-minority counties in Georgia